William Daley (June 27, 1868 – May 4, 1922) was an American Major League Baseball pitcher from 1889 to 1891. He played for the Boston Beaneaters and Boston Reds.

Daley started his professional baseball career with the Jersey City Skeeters in 1887. In 1890 – his only full season in the majors – he led the Players' League in winning percentage with a record of 18–7.

See also
 List of Major League Baseball annual saves leaders

External links

1868 births
1922 deaths
19th-century baseball players
Major League Baseball pitchers
Boston Beaneaters players
Boston Reds (PL) players
Boston Reds (AA) players
Jersey City Skeeters players
Buffalo Bisons (minor league) players
Albany Senators players
Poughkeepsie Bridge Citys players
Baseball players from New York (state)
Sportspeople from Poughkeepsie, New York
Burials at Poughkeepsie Rural Cemetery